Henry Henry (22 May 1846 – 8 March 1908) was an Irish Roman Catholic Prelate and from 1895 until 1908 he held the title Lord Bishop of Down and Connor. He was known for his energy and zeal, as well as his overt activism in local politics, founding the 'Belfast Catholic Association'.

Education and priestly ministry
Henry was born in Loughguile, County Antrim. After his education at St Patrick's College, Maynooth, he was ordained for the Diocese of Down and Connor on 7 June 1870 by Matthew Quinn, the Bishop of Bathurst. The Diocese of Bathurst is located in New South Wales in Australia.

He was appointed to St. Malachy's Diocesan College to teach French and Mathematics. He succeeded Marner as President of the college from 1876 to 1895, before his Episcopal nomination; he is, to date, the longest serving president of the college.

Bishop

He was appointed 25th Bishop of Down and Connor on 6 August 1895 and was consecrated bishop in St Patrick's Church, Belfast on 22 Sept 1895 by Cardinal Logue. One of his first acts was to agree to be patron of the nascent Gaelic League in Belfast. The distinguished Jesuit historian, Fr Oliver P. Rafferty calls Henry Henry "a man of decidedly theocratic tastes" and assesses many of his decisions, especially those relating to politics and civil society as "quixotic."

Dr Henry believed that a religious order of priests could give invaluable help in the densely populated area of West Belfast. Accordingly, he invited the Redemptorists to found a community there at Clonard Monastery. It was a welcome invitation, which they accepted as they were already looking for a foundation in the North.

In 1900, he helped establish St. Mary's Training College to staff local Catholic schools.

Belfast Catholic Association
In 1896, Bishop Henry organised a Catholic Association, initially confined to controlling representation in the newly created Catholic wards [of Belfast]. It dominated municipal politics in West Belfast for a decade: it easily defeated the Nationalist slate of candidates in the two wards in 1897 and 1904, and between these dates its candidates were not even challenged. Its viewpoint dominated the Irish News, the local Catholic newspaper, to such an extent that the Irish Nationalist leader in the city, Joseph Devlin, had to begin a rival, the Northern Star, in 1897.

Henry's episcopal ministry took place against the intensely fought political battles around Irish Home Rule and he worked hard to influence nationalist political opinion, and representation in Belfast, at the heart of his diocese. By 1912, however, Devlin had won control of nationalist thought in the city.

References

External links
 Catholic Hierarchy.org 

1846 births
1908 deaths
People from County Antrim
Alumni of St Patrick's College, Maynooth
19th-century Roman Catholic bishops in Ireland
20th-century Roman Catholic bishops in Ireland
Roman Catholic bishops of Down and Connor